The swimming competition at the 1970 Summer Universiade took place in Turin, Italy in August 1970.

Men's events

Legend:

Women's events

Legend:

References
Medalist Summary (Men) on GBRATHLETICS.com
Medalist Summary (Women) on GBRATHLETICS.com

1970 in swimming
Swimming at the Summer Universiade
1970 Summer Universiade